Dieter Wittesaele (born 21 January 1989 in Ostend) is a Belgian football player currently playing for VK Westhoek.

Career
The forward played previously for K.W.S. Oudenburg, Cercle Brugge K.S.V., K.A.A. Gent, FCV Dender EH and KV Oostende.

References

External links
 
 

1989 births
Living people
Belgian footballers
Cercle Brugge K.S.V. players
K.A.A. Gent players
F.C.V. Dender E.H. players
K.V. Oostende players
Association football forwards
Royal FC Mandel United players